The position of Lord Mayor of Bristol was conferred on the city in June 1899 (effective 15 November 1899) as part of the Queen's Birthday Honours and was confirmed by letters patent dated 1 April 1974. Prior to November 1899 the position of Mayor of Bristol had existed since 1216. The Lord Mayor is the Chairperson of the City Council and has the casting vote. As Bristol's first citizen, they are the non-political, ceremonial head of the city. The Lord Mayor of Bristol is styled The Right Honourable, although without official sanction, rather than the more normal Right Worshipful enjoyed by most other Lord Mayors. The names of all Mayors and Lord Mayors of Bristol since 1216 are cut into the stone walls of the Conference Hall of Bristol City Hall.

Mayors of Bristol: 1216–1899

Mayors of Bristol included the following:

Lord Mayors of Bristol: 1899–present
Source 

2022: Paula O'Rourke

Archives
Papers, photographs and newscuttings relating to Percy Cann are held at Bristol Archives (Ref. 33292) (online catalogue).

References

 
Bristol, Lord Mayors of the City of
Lord Mayors
Lord Mayors